Siltuximab (INN, trade name Sylvant; also known as CNTO 328, anti-IL-6 chimeric monoclonal antibody or cCLB8) is a chimeric (made from human and mouse proteins) monoclonal antibody. It binds to interleukin-6. Siltuximab has been investigated for the treatment of neoplastic diseases: metastatic renal cell cancer, prostate cancer, other types of cancer, and for Castleman's disease. 

On April 23, 2014, siltuximab was FDA approved under the brand name of Sylvant for the treatment of patients with idiopathic multicentric Castleman’s disease (iMCD) who do not have human immunodeficiency virus (HIV) or human herpesvirus-8 (HHV-8).

Medical uses
Used for the treatment of idiopathic multicentric Castleman disease (iMCD).

Clinical trials 

Siltuximab has demonstrated significant efficacy and safety in patients with idiopathic multicentric Castleman disease.  Treatment results with Siltuximab in B-cell non-Hodgkin's lymphoma are inferior to those obtained in multicentric Castleman disease.  Siltuximab has also been evaluated in the treatment ovarian cancer, however the efficacy for this cancer is debatable.  In addition, siltuximab has been evaluated for multiple myeloma, but there was an insignificant increase in response rates.

Side effects
Siltuximab may lower resistance to infections and should not be administered to patients with severe infections. Siltuximab should be discontinued in patients with severe infusion related reactions, anaphylaxis, severe allergic reactions or cytokine release syndromes. Live vaccines should not be administered to patients receiving siltuximab since IL-6 inhibition may interfere with normal immune response to new antigens.

Common
The following has been shown to occur in treatment of Multicentric Castleman's disease with siltuximab during a clinical trial (>10% compared to placebo):

 Peripheral edema 
 Abdominal Pain
 Pruritus
 Increased weight
 Rash
 Hyperuricemia
 Upper respiratory tract infections

Long term exposure

 Upper respiratory tract infection 
 Pain in extremities
 Arthralgia 
 Fatigue

Drug interactions
Siltuximab may increase CYP450 activity leading to increased metabolism of drugs that are CYP450 substrates.  Co-administration of siltuximab and CYP450 substrates with narrow therapeutic index such as warfarin, ciclosporin or theophylline should be closely monitored.

Mechanism of action
Siltuximab is a chimeric monoclonal antibody that binds to interleukin-6 (IL-6), preventing binding to soluble and membrane bound interleukin-6 receptors. Siltuximab interferes with IL-6 mediated growth of B-lymphocytes and plasma cells, secretion of vascular endothelial growth factor (VEGF) and autoimmune phenomena.

References 

Monoclonal antibodies